Bhanotia is a genus of pipefishes native to the Indian and Pacific Oceans.

Species
There are currently three recognized species in this genus:
 Bhanotia fasciolata (A. H. A. Duméril, 1870)
 Bhanotia nuda C. E. Dawson, 1978 (Naked pipefish)
 Bhanotia pauciradiata G. R. Allen & Kuiter, 1995 (Few-rayed pipefish)

References

Syngnathidae
Marine fish genera
Taxa named by Sunder Lal Hora